Wang Kai (born January 22, 1983, in Chongqing) is a Chinese football player who plays as a midfielder or defender.

Club career
Wang Kai started his football career playing for the Chongqing Lifan youth team before he was drafted into the senior team in the 2002 league season. The following seasons saw him gradually establish himself as an integral part of the team and would even go on to captain the side before the club were relegated in the 2006 league season. Wang Kai stayed loyal to the team and after two seasons in the second tier he had his personal best season when he scored ten goals in the 2008 league season to aid Chongqing back into the top tier.

At the end of the 2010 Chinese Super League season Wang Kai would be part of the squad that was relegated at the end of the season. He would go on to join Chengdu Blades, initially on loan before making the move permanent the following season. He would remain with them until the end of the 2014 China League One season when the club experienced relegation and were dissolved due to wage arrears. On 16 January 2015, Wang moved to China League Two side Sichuan Longfor. This was followed by another move the next season when on 22 January 2016, Wang transferred to fellow China League Two side Nantong Zhiyun. He would go on to establish himself as a regular within the team and gained promotion with the club at the end of the 2018 China League Two season.

Club career stats
Last update: 31 December 2020.

References

External links
 
Player stats at Sohu.com

1983 births
Living people
Chinese footballers
Footballers from Chongqing
Chongqing Liangjiang Athletic F.C. players
Chengdu Tiancheng F.C. players
Sichuan Longfor F.C. players
Nantong Zhiyun F.C. players
Chinese Super League players
China League One players
China League Two players
Association football midfielders